Roadshow Entertainment (formerly known as Roadshow Home Video from 1982–1993) is an Australian home video, production and distribution company that is a division of Village Roadshow (formerly Roadshow Home Video and Roadshow Entertainment) that distributes films in Australia and New Zealand. Their first release was Mad Max. Roadshow Entertainment is an independent video distributor in Australia and New Zealand.

History 
In 1982, Village Roadshow Entertainment was founded as Roadshow Home Video. Their first batch of movie titles, released on both VHS and Betamax format, were:
 Sex World (1978)
 The Never Dead (aka: Phantasm, 1979)
 Mad Max (1979, with blue cover art)
 Insatiable (1980)
 Little Lord Fauntleroy (1980)
 A Change of Seasons (1980)
 Atlantic City (1980)
 Scanners (1981)
 King of the Mountain (1981)
 Montenegro (1981)
 Endless Love (1981) 

1983: Palace Films was started as a home video distributor between Roadshow, Blake Films and private investor Antony Veccola.

In 1985, Roadshow Home Video became Village Roadshow Home Video and Premiere Home Entertainment was established. Veccola bought out the other company's stock of Palace and it ventured out into the film distribution business and opened a small number of art-house cinemas around Australia's main cities and became an independent company. Its home video release were still handled by Village Roadshow until the late 1990s.

1990: Applause Home Video and Video Selection Australia were established as a Village Roadshow label.

1993: Village Roadshow Home Video becomes Village Roadshow Entertainment.

Late 1990s: Palace home video distribution with Roadshow has been expired.

Roadshow started releasing DVDs in Australia with the release of Evita on 31 October 1997.

In 2008, Roadshow started releasing Blu-rays.

On 21 September 2020, Warner Bros. announced that its distribution deal with Village Roadshow would expire at the end of 2020. The two studios' partnership had lasted for more than four decades. Since 2021, Warner Bros' films are released theatrically through Universal Pictures International, while Roadshow is continuing to release future Warner Bros. titles through their physical media and digital formats.

Roadshow and Village Roadshow subsidiaries and divisions 
 Premiere Home Entertainment (1985–1993) – a division of Village Roadshow
 Festival Video (1983–1990s) – a joint venture with Festival Mushroom Records and Warner Bros.
 Mushroom Video (1983–1990s) – a joint venture with Festival Mushroom Records and Warner Bros.
 Applause Home Video (c. 1990–1993) – a division of Village Roadshow
 Reel Corporation (2000s–) – budget division of Village Roadshow
 Hopscotch Films (2005–2011) – distributed by Village Roadshow
 Palace Home Video/Entertainment/Films (1983–2000) – (subsidiary of Roadshow/Village Roadshow)
 Roadshow New Media (1990s) – video games publishing division of Village Roadshow, also known as Roadshow Interactive
 Roadshow-Lorimar Home Video (1985–1990) – a division for distributing Lorimar releases
 Roadshow Music (1994–2013)

Labels distributed, duplicated and re-supplied 
Roadshow Entertainment has its own label named Roadshow Films, which is in turn the theatrical distribution unit of Village Roadshow. On 16 December 2014, Roadshow Films acquired a 33% stake in American film production and international sales company FilmNation Entertainment. However, as of 2017, Roadshow Films' stake has since reduced to 31%.
 ABC (branded as ABC DVD and ABC Music)
 Foxtel Original
 Lantern Entertainment
 Dimension Films (post-2005 titles only)
 Lionsgate
 Nine Network (mid 1990s–present)
 Network 10 (1980s–mid 1990s, 2018–present)
 Fremantle
 Village Roadshow Pictures
 Warner Bros. Home Entertainment (mid 2016–present)
 MGM Home Entertainment (1998–2005, 2020–present) (moved to Warner Bros. Home Entertainment internationally)
 Reel Corporation (branded as Reel DVD)
 ITV Studios Home Entertainment (branded as ITV)
 FilmNation Entertainment
 Mandalay Pictures

Former 
 Endeavour Entertainment (branded as Endeavour-Roadshow)
 Walt Disney Studios Home Entertainment (1984–1994) 
 New World International (1990s)
 BBC (1996–2019) (moved to Universal Sony Pictures Home Entertainment)
 Focus Features (2003–2009)
 Warner Bros. Pictures (2015–2020) (moved to Universal Pictures International)
 Miramax (pre-2022) (moved to Paramount Pictures International)

References

External links 
 Roadshow Home Video
 Welcome to Roadshow

Mass media companies of Australia
Home video distributors
Home video companies of Australia
Entertainment companies established in 1982
Mass media companies established in 1982
1982 establishments in Australia
Companies based in Sydney
Film distributors of Australia